Qolkhanchek-e Shah Tutiya (also Romanized as Qolkhānchek-e Shāh Ţūṭīyā; also known as Falkhānjak-e Soflá, Qalkhānchak, and Qolkhānchek) is a village in Dasht-e Zahab Rural District, in the Central District of Sarpol-e Zahab County, Kermanshah Province, Iran. At the 2006 census, its population was 140, in 28 families.

References 

Populated places in Sarpol-e Zahab County